José Bas Molina (born 12 January 1952) is a Spanish former freestyle swimmer who competed in the 1976 Summer Olympics.

Notes

References

1952 births
Living people
Spanish male freestyle swimmers
Olympic swimmers of Spain
Swimmers at the 1976 Summer Olympics
Mediterranean Games gold medalists for Spain
Mediterranean Games medalists in swimming
Swimmers at the 1971 Mediterranean Games
Swimmers at the 1975 Mediterranean Games